Kilkhampton is a village and civil parish in northeast Cornwall, England, United Kingdom.  
The village is on the A39 about four miles (6 km) north-northeast of Bude.

Kilkhampton was mentioned in the Domesday Book as "Chilchetone". The population of the parish was 1,193 in the 2001 census. This increased to 1,368 in the 2011 census 

The remains of a late Norman period motte-and-bailey castle known as Penstowe Castle are located 500 metres west of the village. Further west, at Stowe is the site of Stowe House, the grand mansion of John Granville, 1st Earl of Bath, built in 1680 but demolished in 1739: some of the stonework was reused at Penstowe, also in the parish.

Kilkhampton has a post office, a primary school, and a community centre called the Grenville Rooms. There are three general stores, two pubs, and a selection of shops including an electrical goods store. There is also a MOT test station and an agricultural supply depot. The village was surveyed for the Survey of English Dialects.

A crater on Mars has been named Kilkhampton.

History
The manor of "Chilchetone" was very valuable at the time of Domesday Book. It had paid tax on 7 hides in the previous reign and there was land for 40 ploughs. 26 villagers and 23 smallholders had 26 ploughs between them and there was also  of meadow, 20 sq furlongs of pasture and a considerable woodland. The livestock were 50 cattle, 600 sheep, 20 pigs and 40 goats; the annual value was £18.

Kilkhampton Church
Kilkhampton Church, with its magnificent Norman south doorway and lofty buttressed Perpendicular tower of eight bells, is dedicated to St James the Great and is at least 450 years old. But some historians claim parts of it to be around 1000 years old. It is one of many churches dedicated to this saint on a pilgrims' route, which leads ultimately to Santiago de Compostela in northern Spain. The church contains an impressive monument to the Cornish hero Sir Bevil Grenville. Other features of interest are the south porch (dated 1567), a fine series of benchends of the first half of the 16th century. (The benchends are from the same workshop as those of Launcells and Poughill.)

The tenor bell was found to be cracked in 2006: after repairs, it was re-hung and the full peal of eight bells were first heard again on Sunday 23 September 2007.

In medieval times there was a chapel at Stowe House, licensed in 1386, but dedicated to St Christina in 1519 by Bishop Thomas Vyvyan. At Alderscombe there was another chapel.

Notable residents
See also People from Kilkhampton
The England rugby union captain Phil Vickery grew up in the village and his family still own a substantial amount of the surrounding farmland
Thomas Greenway, Premier of the Canadian province of Manitoba until 1908, was born in the village.
Sir Bevil Grenville, Royalist commander in the Civil War
Henry Robinson was Rector in the 1850s

References

External links

 Kilkhampton Parish website

Villages in Cornwall
Civil parishes in Cornwall
Manors in Cornwall